Terry Williams may refer to:

Sports
Terrance Williams (born 1989), American football player
Terrence Williams (born 1987), American basketball player
Terry Williams (defensive back) (born 1965), former American football defensive back
Terry Williams (footballer) (born 1966), English former professional footballer
Terry Williams (athlete) (born 1968), English sprinter
Terry Williams (running back) (born 1992), gridiron football running back
Terry Williams (wide receiver) (born 1996), gridiron football wide receiver

Others
J. Terry Williams (1930–2015), film editor
Terry Williams (musician) (born 1947), American singer-songwriter and guitarist
Terry Williams (drummer) (born 1948), Welsh rock drummer
Terry Tempest Williams (born 1955), American author, naturalist, and environmental activist
Terry Williams (condemned prisoner) (born 1968), American convicted murderer sentenced to death
Terry Williams (politician), member of the Vermont Senate
Terry Williams (Hollyoaks), a character on the British soap opera Hollyoaks

See also
Disappearances of Terrance Williams and Felipe Santos